Gina Tognoni  (born November 28, 1973) is an American actress, best known for her work with American daytime soap operas.  Her most notable performances include Kelly Cramer on One Life to Live, Dinah Marler on Guiding Light and Phyllis Summers on The Young and the Restless.

Career
Tognoni is known for her roles on daytime television soap operas. In 1995, she made her soap debut as Kelly Cramer in ABC's One Life to Live. She appeared on the show until 2001. In April 2001, it was announced that Tognoni, after six years with the show, had decided not to renew her contract with the series. Tognoni returned to daytime television as Dinah Marler on CBS's Guiding Light in July 2004, and won her first Daytime Emmy Award for Outstanding Supporting Actress in a Drama Series in 2006 for her work on the show. In 2007, she was nominated again in the same category but lost to Genie Francis. She won her second Emmy in 2008, becoming only the second actress to be a repeat winner in the Supporting Actress category.
 
In 2009, after CBS canceled Guiding Light, Tognoni returned to her role as Kelly Cramer on One Life to Live. Also it was reported that Tognoni was in talks with several soaps for her post-Guiding Light gig. Following the April 2011 cancelation of One Life to Live and All My Children, it was announced that Tognoni and co-star Tom Degnan, who was portraying Joey Buchanan at the time, would exit the series before its January 2012 finale. In addition to her career on soaps, Tognoni had guest-starring roles in Law & Order: Special Victims Unit and The Sopranos, and co-starred in a number of television shows and independent films.

On May 22, 2014, it was announced that Tognoni was cast as Phyllis Summers in CBS's The Young and the Restless, replacing Michelle Stafford. Tognoni made her debut on August 11, 2014.
At the 42nd Daytime Emmy Awards in 2015, Tognoni was nominated for Outstanding Lead Actress for her role as Phyllis Summers. At the 44th Daytime Emmy Awards in 2017, she was again nominated for Outstanding Lead Actress for which she won. On March 30, 2019, it was announced that Tognoni would be leaving The Young and the Restless, following the decision to fire her while in contract and return Stafford to the role. Tognoni's last appearance in the role aired on June 7, 2019.

Personal life
Tognoni was born in St. Louis, Missouri. She won Miss Rhode Island Teen USA in 1991 and Miss Rhode Island Teen All-American in 1993. Tognoni became engaged to Joseph Chiarello on November 21, 2007. She was introduced to him by her co-star Beth Ehlers.  The two were married May 16, 2009.

Filmography

Awards and nominations

References

External links

1973 births
Living people
1993 beauty pageant contestants
20th-century Miss Teen USA delegates
American soap opera actresses
American people of Italian descent
Daytime Emmy Award winners
Daytime Emmy Award for Outstanding Lead Actress in a Drama Series winners
Daytime Emmy Award for Outstanding Supporting Actress in a Drama Series winners
20th-century American actresses
21st-century American actresses
American television actresses